The Abner L. Harris House is located in Reedsburg, Wisconsin.

History
Abner L. Harris was Postmaster and Mayor of Reedsburg. The house was listed on the National Register of Historic Places in 1984 and on the State Register of Historic Places in 1989.

References

Houses on the National Register of Historic Places in Wisconsin
National Register of Historic Places in Sauk County, Wisconsin
Houses in Sauk County, Wisconsin
Second Empire architecture in Wisconsin
Brick buildings and structures
Houses completed in 1873
Reedsburg, Wisconsin